Shah Najaf Imambara is one of the several imambaras in Lucknow. It is located centrally in the city and is less known than Asafi and Hussainabad Imambara.

Location
Shah Najaf Imambara is located in heart of the city on the Rana Pratap Road. It is close to the Sikandar Bagh Chauraha and is flanked by   National Botanical Research Institute on one side. The front portion faces the Sahara Ganj Mall. The monuments is quite close to Hazratganj Market and close to many official building like Indra Bhawan and Jawahar Bhawan. Also, it lies quite close to the river Gomti on the rear side. A popular road is named as Shah Najaf Road in Lucknow.

History
Shah Najaf Imambara was constructed by Nawab Ghazi-ud-Din Haider, the last nawab wazir and the first King of the state of Awadh in 1816 - 1817. This imambara served as his mausoleum and was copy of Ali's tomb in Najaf in Iraq. Apart from Nawab Ghazi-ud-Din, his three wives Sarfaraz Mahal, Mubarak Mahal and Mumtaz Mahal were also buried there.

See also
Chota Imambara
Bara Imambara
Roomi Darwaza
Chattar Manzil
Imambara Ghufran Ma'ab
Imambaras of Lucknow

References

External links 

Shia Islam
Islam in India
Imambaras of Lucknow
1817 establishments in India
Religious buildings and structures completed in 1817
Indo-Islamic architecture